Stree is a 1972 Bengali film directed by Salil Dutta starring actors Uttam Kumar, Soumitra Chatterjee and Arati Bhattacharya in lead roles. Nachiketa Ghosh composed the music. The film was remade in Hindi as Ayaash. Film was based on the novel of Bimal Mitra as same title and the era of the plot showing during the Second World War.

Plot 
Sitapati (Soumitra Chatterjee), a homeless youth, comes to landlord Madhav Dutta's (Uttam Kumar) house and gets a job as his cameraman. Sitapati discovers his former girlfriend Mrinmoyee (Arati Bhattacharya) is now Madhav Dutta's wife. Madhav's polygamy and Mirnmoyee's loneliness prompt her extramarital relationship with Sitapati. Baiji dance and alcoholism, love, betrayal, hatred - Sitapati's lens captures it all. Finally, Sitapati leaves the house, Mrinmoyee dies, and gradually Madhav learns about their relationship. Madhav cannot bear the fact that his wife has committed adultery. He goes to take revenge and shoots Sitapati who is already dead, then becomes mad and shoots himself.

Cast
Uttam Kumar as Madhab Dutta (Zamindar)
Soumitra Chatterjee as Sitapati
Arati Bhattacharya as Madhab Dutta's Wife
Bhanu Bandyopadhyay
Jahor Roy as Gobardhan Choudhury
Tarun Kumar as Sitapati's Brother-in-law
Subrata Chattopadhyay as Sitapati's Sister
Sulata Chowdhury as Maid Servant
Moni Srimani
Amarnath Mukhopadhyay as Lawyer
Ashok Mitra
Rasaraj Chakraborty
Parijat Bose
Ajay Bandyopadhyay
Kalyani Ghosh
Arindam Ganguly
Jhuma Mukhopadhyay

Soundtrack

Reception
The Times of India wrote "Stree, one of the finest works of Uttam Kumar, reminds us that icons like him are rare. Uttam Kumar stepped out of his romantic image and tried something just the opposite. A drunkard Bengali zamindar without any sense of chastity – he was unrecognizable in this negative character. Yet he bamboozled everyone with this persona. Even critics admitted only Uttam Kumar can do this. The Uttam-Soumitra movie remains a classic one and Uttam's dialogues still haunt us.

Awards 
BFJA Awards  (1973)

 BFJA Best Actor - Uttam Kumar 
 BFJA Best Actor In a Supporting Role - Soumitra Chatterjee 
 BFJA Best Dialogue - Salil Dutta
 BFJA Best Lyrics  - Pulak Bandopadhyay
 BFJA Best Music  - Nachiketa Ghosh
 BFJA Best Playback Singer (Male) - Manna Dey

Remake
The film was remade in Hindi as Ayaash.

References 

1972 films
Indian black-and-white films
Bengali-language Indian films
Bengali films remade in other languages
1970s Bengali-language films
Films directed by Salil Dutta
Films based on Indian novels